Bobby Thompson (born January 16, 1947) is an American football executive and retired running back. An alumnus of the University of Oklahoma, Thompson played two seasons in the National Football League for the Detroit Lions and, before that, in the Canadian Football League for the Saskatchewan Roughriders.

Thompson served as an executive with the Stars Football League, a league founded and managed by his former agent, Peter Hulthwaite, throughout that league's existence.

References

1947 births
Living people
Sportspeople from Raleigh, North Carolina
Players of American football from Raleigh, North Carolina
American football running backs
Oklahoma Sooners football players
Detroit Lions players
Saskatchewan Roughriders players
American expatriate sportspeople in Canada